Aleksei Aleksandrovich Kutsero (born 20 March 1997) is a Russian football player.

He made his debut in the Russian Football National League for FC Baltika Kaliningrad on 11 October 2015 in a game against FC Zenit-2 Saint Petersburg.

References

External links
 Profile by Russian Football National League

1997 births
Living people
Russian footballers
FC Baltika Kaliningrad players
Association football midfielders